JXL may refer to:

 JXL, Vocalist of Crash Worship
 Junkie XL, Dutch musician
 Java Excel API
 JPEG XL, an image file format